Luma apiculata, the Chilean myrtle or temu, is a species of flowering plant in the myrtle family, native to the central Andes between Chile and Argentina, at 33 to 45° south latitude.

Description
The Chilean myrtle grows slowly, forming a small tree of around 10 to 15 m, rarely 20 m. Its trunk appears twisted and contorted and has smooth bark, coloured grey to bright orange-brown, which peels as the tree grows - giving a two-tone appearance of rich cinnamon colour, contrasted with cream. It is evergreen, with small, fragrant, oval leaves 2.0 to 2.5 cm long and 1.5 broad, and profuse white flowers in early to midsummer. Its fruit is an edible black or blue berry 1.0 cm in diameter, ripe in early autumn.

Names and synonyms
Synonyms include Eugenia apiculata DC., Myrceugenia apiculata (DC.) Niedenzu, and Myrceugenella apiculata (DC.) Kausel. Common names include arrayán (from a Spanish name for the related European myrtle), kelümamüll (orange-wood) (the Mapuche Native American name), shortleaf stopper, palo colorado and temu.

Etymology
Luma is a derivation of a vernacular Chilean name for this species, while apiculata means 'with a small, broadly pointed tip'.

Habitat
The Chilean myrtle grows along water currents in the Valdivian temperate rain forests in Chile, while in Argentina it grows from Neuquén south to the Chubut River. The main forests are on the Quetrihué Peninsula (Mapuche for 'myrtles') and on Isla Victoria on the Nahuel Huapi Lake, within the Los Arrayanes National Park and Nahuel Huapí National Park, respectively, in Argentina. It can be also found in lesser numbers along the Arrayanes River in Los Alerces National Park. Trees in these protected areas are up to 650 years old. The notable Argentinian myrtle forest of the Los Arrayanes National Park covers 20 ha of the Quetrihué Peninsula, where the cinnamon-coloured myrtles leave almost no space for other trees.

Cultivation and uses
Its fruit is appreciated in Chile and Argentina and its flowers are important for honey production. The Chilean myrtle has medicinal uses for the Mapuche people. It is also kept as bonsai and cultivated in gardens for the contrast of the glossy foliage and slender red stems. It has become naturalised in parts of Ireland and western Great Britain and it has been planted in Spain. Also suspected to be naturalising in New Zealand and the Pacific Northwest of the United States. 

This plant has gained the Royal Horticultural Society's Award of Garden Merit.

Gallery

References

External links

Luma apiculata in Encyclopedia of the Chilean Flora
Luma apiculata in Chilebosque
Jepson Manual Treatment
Parque Nac. Los Arrayanes en Argentina

Myrtaceae
Flora of central Chile
Trees of Chile
Trees of Argentina
Trees of Mediterranean climate
Trees of mild maritime climate
Ornamental trees
Berries
Flora of the Valdivian temperate rainforest